Bredenkamp is a German and Afrikaans surname. Notable people with the surname include:

Eital Bredenkamp (born 1993), South African rugby union player
Jean Bredenkamp (born 1993), South African cricketer
John Bredenkamp (born 1940), Zimbabwean businessman and former rugby union footballer
Mike Bredenkamp (1873–1940), South African rugby union player
Niel Bredenkamp (born 1987), South African cricketer